Hybrid computing may refer to:

 Analog-digital hybrid computation (see Hybrid computer)
 Symbolic-numeric computation
 A term for heterogeneous computing